WEBG (95.9 FM, "Fox Sports 1330") is a radio station licensed to Mina, New York owned by iHeartMedia. Its transmitter is located near Northeast Sherman Rd and Miller Rd in Chautauqua County New York. The station broadcasts a sports format as a simulcast of WFNN (1330 AM) from Erie, Pennsylvania. The station has a rimshot signal serving the nearby Erie market, however it is unable to be heard in the city itself because of co-channel interference from low-power Three Angels Broadcasting Network repeater WBIT-LP in the city. Its signal is strongest in rural western Chautauqua County, New York but is spotty in the population centers of Dunkirk, Fredonia and Jamestown.

WEBG is iHeart's only broadcast property in New York west of Rochester. It (and its predecessor Clear Channel) has historically owned stations across almost all markets of New York except Western New York. WEBG's minimal local operations are headquartered along with iHeart's stations in Erie at the Boston Store building.

History

It signed on as WJRK on November 27, 2017, soft launching with Christmas music for the holiday season. The station changed its call sign to WLTM on December 6, 2017, and officially launched on January 3, 2018, as adult contemporary 95.9 Lite FM, using an AC format syndicated from Westwood One.

On March 27, 2019, Connoisseur Media announced that it would transfer WLTM along with its sister stations to iHeartMedia in exchange for WFRE and WFMD in the Frederick, Maryland, market from the Aloha Station Trust. The sale closed on May 20, 2019.

From November 5 to December 25, 2019, the station broadcast Christmas music as Christmas 95.9. On December 26, 2019, the station flipped to talk radio as iHeartPodcast 95.9, with a schedule consisting exclusively of podcasts distributed by iHeartMedia and its subsidiaries, including Stuff You Should Know among others. The station changed its call sign to WEBG on September 14, 2020; the call sign was transferred from co-owned WCHI-FM in Chicago, which had used it when it was branded as "Big".

On January 10, 2022, WEBG flipped to Fox Sports Radio as a simulcast of WFNN in Erie. It was the last station to carry the iHeartPodcast format.

References

External links

EBG (FM)
IHeartMedia radio stations
Radio stations established in 2017
2017 establishments in New York (state)
Fox Sports Radio stations
Sports radio stations in the United States